Jean-Auguste-Gustave Binet (3 June 1875 – 20 April 1940), also known as Binet-Valmer, was a Franco-Swiss novelist and journalist. The trademark element of his style was the almost clinical precision with which he dissected the psychologies and motivations of his characters.

Biography

Born as the son of a physician, Binet-Valmer initially also studied medicine, but later turned his attention towards writing novels and reviews. Although Binet-Valmer was not homosexual himself, several of his novels, particularly his most famous one, Lucien, deal with homosexual themes and characters.

Lucien was by far Binet-Valmer's most successful book in France, getting released in no fewer than 22 printings between its first edition in 1910 and 1919. It also caused a minor scandal because of its—for the time—risqué discussion of homosexuality. Marcel Proust's opinion of Lucien was damning—he wrote that it was the stupidest book he had ever read (le livre le plus imbécile que j'aie jamais lu). Other critics, such as Edmond Jaloux, had a far more favorable attitude towards the book. The ending of Lucien was very unusual for the time, because instead of having Lucien commit suicide (then considered more or less the standard ending for a novel with a homosexual protagonist), in the final paragraph Binet-Valmer lets him elope to Naples together with his boyfriend Reginald Green.

As a journalist, Binet-Valmer wrote for magazines such as Mercure de France, Le Matin, and Revue de Paris. He also indirectly caused Proust to change the title of his magnum opus, In Search of Lost Time: Initially it was called Les Intermittences du cœur, but when Proust learned that Binet-Valmer had published the novel Le Cœur en désordre (1912), the name was changed to À la recherche du temps perdu, with the former title making an appearance as a subtitle in the volume Sodome et Gomorrhe (1921/22). However, Proust later acknowledged in a letter to Jacques Boulenger, editor of L'Opinion, that "the whole press (except Binet-Valmer) deserted" him "about Sodome et Gomorrhe".

Novelist Georges Simenon was an assistant to Binet-Valmer for a few months in late 1922 and used that encounter for episodes in two of his novels (Les Noces de Poitiers and Le Passage de la ligne). From 1929, he rallyed publicly to Action Française, of which he was previously close, he joined the Camelots of the King, entered the Committee of the Association Marius Platteau (French Action Combators), accepts Maxime Real del Sarte the presidency of the companions of Jeanne d'Arc.

After the 1930s, Binet-Valmer fell into relative obscurity, especially compared to his contemporary Marcel Proust whose fame has eclipsed Binet-Valmer's ever since.

Works

Le Sphinx de plâtre, 1900
Les Métèques, roman de mœurs parisiennes, 1900
Le Gamin tendre, 1901
Lucien, Ollendorff, 1910; Flammarion, 1921
Notre pauvre amour, 1911
Le Cœur en désordre, 1912
La Créature, 1913
La Passion, 1914
Mémoires d'un engagé volontaire, Flammarion, 1918 ; Nabu Press, 2010
Le Mendiant magnifique, 1919
L'Enfant qui meurt, 1921
Les Jours sans gloire, 1922
Le Plaisir, illustré par des bois de Paul Baudier, 1923
Le Désordre, 1923
Le Désir et le Péché, 1923
Une femme a tué, 1924
Le Sang, 1924
Les Exaltées, 1925
Ceux qui ne volent pas, 1926
Un grand Français: Coligny, 1927
Sur le sable couchées, Flammarion, 1928
Irina l'exilée, 1928
La Vie amoureuse de Marie Walewska, la femme polonaise de Napoléon, 1928
La Tragédie du retour, roman de l'amour et de l'âge, 1929
La Lumière, roman d'une cécité, 1929
La Foire d'empoigne, roman d'une autre république, Flammarion, 1930
La Femme qui travaille, Flammarion, 1930
La Prostituée ingénue, 1930
Le Jardin de l'impure, 1930
La Luxure, 1932
Maîtres du monde, 1933
Le Regard, 1934
Bathilde et l'Assassin, 1935
Sarah Bernhardt, 1936
Le Fumier, 1936
La Princesse nue, Fayard, 1937
L'Héritage, 1938
Les Esprits de ténèbres, 1940

References

Binet-Valmer: Lucien. Männerschwarm Verlag, Hamburg 2009. With an afterword by Wolfram Setz. (The afterword by Setz has about two pages of references.)

External links
 

1875 births
1940 deaths
Writers from Geneva
20th-century French novelists
French journalists
20th-century Swiss novelists
French male novelists
Swiss male novelists
19th-century Swiss journalists
20th-century French male writers
French male non-fiction writers
20th-century Swiss journalists